Jesse Walter Bishop (March 1, 1933 – October 22, 1979) was an American criminal convicted of the December 1977 murder of David Ballard during a robbery at a Las Vegas Strip casino. Bishop was executed in 1979 by the state of Nevada via gas chamber, becoming the first person to be executed in Nevada since 1961. He was also the first person to be executed in Nevada since the reinstatement of the death penalty, and the third (after Gary Gilmore and John Spenkelink) in the United States. Bishop had spent twenty years of his life incarcerated for various felony offenses and bragged about having committed an estimated eighteen homicides.

Early life
Bishop was born on March 1, 1933, in Glasgow, Kentucky. One of four children, Bishop's parents separated when he was 5, resulting in him moving in with his father in East Los Angeles, California. According to Bishop, his father beat him twice a year regardless of whether he had done anything wrong or not. At age 15, Bishop joined a street gang and committed his first armed robbery in Southern California. Two years later, he joined the Air Force as a paratrooper. He served in the Korean War where he sustained injuries and was decorated for his actions.

Bishop developed a drug habit and was caught in possession of heroin, resulting in him being dishonorably discharged. He spent two years at the United States Disciplinary Barracks in Fort Leavenworth, Kansas, before returning to life as a civilian. He then led a life of crime which was mostly full of drug offenses and robberies.

Murder
In 1962, Bishop served time in a California state prison for robbery and spent five years behind bars. He was paroled in 1967 but continued his life of crime, abusing heroin, and committing robberies. In 1970, he returned to prison once again. He successfully escaped from prison in 1972 but was caught shortly afterward and returned. In 1976, he won a parole to Los Angeles, however, according to prison records, he continued to abuse heroin and commit crimes. In 1977, he committed an armed robbery and became a wanted fugitive.

On December 20, 1977, Bishop walked into the El Morocco casino on the Las Vegas Strip in Las Vegas, Nevada. Armed with a .38-caliber revolver, he held up the female cashier and demanded all of the money. Two men witnessed the robbery and attempted to intervene. Employee Larry Thompson, and another casino customer, David Ballard, tried to stop him. Bishop shot Thompson in the stomach and Ballard in the back as he tried to flee. Bishop stole $238 and fled the casino. Thompson survived the shooting, but Ballard, a 22-year-old newlywed Volkswagen mechanic from Baltimore, Maryland, succumbed to his injuries and died in hospital on December 30. He never regained consciousness following the shooting. He had been married for only three hours before being shot.

Capture
Following the shooting, Bishop fled the casino in a green car, which was found abandoned at the Frontier Hotel the following day. He later robbed a man at the Union Plaza Hotel in downtown Las Vegas a day after the murder and stole his car. Bishop abandoned the stolen car and then stole a pickup truck during his attempt to flee from authorities. He took hostages and got into another car at gunpoint, ordering the owner to drive him around. He then hijacked a U.S. mail truck and took another hostage. Finally, he stole a UPS truck, bringing the number of stolen vehicles to five. He eventually abandoned the UPS truck and made his way on foot.

On December 22, two days after the casino robbery, Bishop was captured following an extensive manhunt. He was captured in Boulder City, Nevada, sleeping beneath a mobile home or camper. The gun used in the murder was found in his possession. Despite claiming he would shoot it out with authorities, Bishop surrendered quietly and was taken into custody before being taken back to Las Vegas to face charges.

Execution
Bishop was first sentenced to death on February 10, 1978, after he admitted to murdering Ballard. Bishop said he would not appeal from the moment he was sentenced and even feared his execution would never be carried out. Under Nevada law, the Supreme Court of Nevada must review any death sentence. An automatic appeal was filed against the wishes of Bishop, who tried to fire his attorneys in an attempt to speed up his execution. In 1979, the Supreme Court of Nevada refused to reverse the sentence.

On August 1, 1979, Bishop was sentenced to die in the gas chamber for the murder of Ballard. His execution was originally scheduled for August 27, 1979. However, on August 25, Justice William Rehnquist issued a stay, ordering the state of Nevada to answer a series of questions. The stay was later extended until late September. After the stay was lifted, Bishop was rescheduled for execution on October 22, 1979.

In the early hours of October 22, Bishop was led into the Nevada gas chamber by prison guards. He was strapped into one of the death chairs and the execution via gas inhalation proceeded. Fourteen people witnessed the execution. Bishop was pronounced dead at 12:21 a.m. by prison officials. His last meal was filet mignon, tossed salad with Thousand Island dressing, asparagus, baked potato with sour cream and an unspecified dessert. Bishop was the third person to be executed in the United States since 1976, after Gary Gilmore and John Spenkelink. He was also the first person to be executed in Nevada since 1961. Bishop was the last inmate in Nevada to be executed by the gas chamber. Executions thereafter have been carried out by lethal injection in the same chamber.

See also
 Capital punishment in Nevada
 Capital punishment in the United States
 List of people executed in Nevada

References

1933 births
1979 deaths
1977 murders in the United States
20th-century executions by Nevada
20th-century executions of American people
American people executed for murder
People convicted of murder by Nevada
People from Glasgow, Kentucky
Executed people from Kentucky
 People executed by Nevada by gas chamber
Suspected serial killers